Piptospatha is a genus of flowering plants in the family Araceae. The genus is characteristic is rheophytic and has seeds that are dispersed by splashes of water hitting its cup-like spathes. It is native to Southeast Asia (Thailand, Malaysia, Borneo).

Piptospatha burbidgei (N.E.Br.) M.Hotta - Sarawak, Sabah
Piptospatha elongata (Engl.) N.E.Br. - Kalimantan Barat
Piptospatha impolita S.Y.Wong, P.C.Boyce & Bogner - Sarawak
Piptospatha insignis N.E.Br. - Sarawak
Piptospatha manduensis Bogner & A.Hay - Kalimantan Timur
Piptospatha marginata (Engl.) N.E.Br. - Sarawak
Piptospatha perakensis (Engl.) Ridl. - southern Thailand, Peninsular Malaysia
Piptospatha remiformis Ridl. - Sarawak
Piptospatha repens H.Okada & Tsukaya - Kalimantan Barat
Piptospatha ridleyi N.E.Br. ex Hook.f. - Johor, Pahang, Selangor
Piptospatha truncata (M.Hotta) Bogner & A.Hay - Sarawak
Piptospatha viridistigma S.Y.Wong, P.C.Boyce & Bogner - Sarawak

References

Aroideae
Araceae genera
Flora of Thailand
Flora of Peninsular Malaysia
Flora of Borneo
Taxa named by N. E. Brown